PHP4Delphi is a Visual Development Framework for creating custom PHP Extensions using Delphi. PHP extension, in the most basic of terms, is a set of instructions that is designed to add functionality to PHP.

Overview 

 PHP4Delphi provides Visual Development Framework for creating custom PHP Extensions using Delphi. PHP extension, in the most basic of terms, is a set of instructions that is designed to add functionality to PHP. 
 PHP4Delphi also allows executing the PHP scripts within the Delphi program directly from file or memory. You can read and write global PHP variables and set the result value.
 PHP4Delphi allows you to embed the PHP interpreter into your Delphi application so you can extend and customize the application without having to recompile it.

Structure 

PHP4Delphi is organized into the following subprojects:

PHP scripting 

PHP4Delphi allows executing the PHP scripts within the Delphi program using TpsvPHP component directly without a Web server. It is a scripting for applications (like VBA for Microsoft Office) that enable you to write client-side GUI applications or server-side PHP support in case if you are developing PHP enabled web servers. One of the goals behind it was to prove that PHP is a capable general-purpose scripting language that is suited for more than just Web applications. With PHP4Delphi you can use Delphi forms instead of web-forms, pass parameters to script directly.

PHP extensions development framework 

Visual Development Framework gives possibility to create custom PHP Extensions using Delphi.

PHP4Applications 

PHP4Applications allows to integrate PHP in any application. 
Supports C#, C, C++, Visual Basic, VBA, Delphi, Delphi .NET, Visual Basic .NET, etc.

External links 
 Official PHP4Delphi website
 Official PHP website
 Official CodeGear website
 PHPX control
 PHP architect magazine
 Delphi-PHP Forums

Free compilers and interpreters
PHP software